Kingston is a town on the outskirts of Hobart, Tasmania, Australia.  Nestled 12 km south of the city between and around several hills, Kingston is the seat of the Kingborough Council, and today serves as the gateway between Hobart and the D'Entrecasteaux Channel region, which meets the Derwent River nearby.  It is one of the fastest-growing regions in Tasmania. The Kingston-Huntingfield statistical area had an estimated population of 11,200 in June 2012.

Although the Kingston-Blackmans Bay region is statistically classed as a separate urban area to Hobart by the ABS, Kingston is also part of the Greater Hobart statistical area.

History
In 1804, the botanist Robert Brown visited the area. Browns River, that runs from Mount Wellington to Kingston Beach is named after him.  The area was settled in 1808 by Thomas Lucas and his family, who were evacuated from Norfolk Island, and quickly the land became actively used by many pioneers who spread out to form the beginnings of Kingston's localities today. In its early years, the area was also named after Brown, but when the population grew and a commercial district was established, Kingston was proclaimed a township in 1851.

The Kingston region comprises many suburban estates, including Blackmans Bay and Kingston Beach.

Kingston has close ties with the Dutch community, where after 1950 many post-war immigrants moved to an area they called 'Little Groningen' (today Firthside). The Kingston Dutch community were primarily members of the Christian Reformed Churches of Australia, which they set up the local church of in 1952. Calvin Christian School was founded by the Dutch community in 1962.

Kingston was named by the Best Suburb in Australia for families by Aussie Home Loans in their annual study of 3800 Australian towns.

Economy
Kingston hosts the national headquarters of the Australian Antarctic Division. It has two major shopping centres, Kingston Town Shopping Centre and Channel Court Shopping Centre. The newest shopping centre complex opened in 2008 its new name is, Kingston Plaza, which was built over the existing Coles supermarket site, comprising a new one and 15 other shops.

Media
Kingston is served by two free publications; the full-size newspaper Kingborough Chronicle and the weekly newsletter Kingston Classifieds.
Kingston is served by Pulse FM Kingborough and Huon and Huon FM 98.5.

Education
Kingston is served by a pair of public schools, Kingston High School (Grade 7–10) and Kingston Primary School (grade 1–6). It is also served by three private Christian schools; Calvin Christian School (kinder to year 12) and Southern Christian College (kinder to year 12), both of which are nondenominational, and the Kingston campus of St Aloysius Catholic College (grade kinder to year 4) at Kingston campus, grade 5 to year 10 at Huntingfield campus).

Sister cities
  Grootegast, Netherlands

References

External links
Kingborough Municipal Council
Australian Antarctic Division

 
Localities of Kingborough Council
Suburbs of Hobart
Localities of City of Hobart
Towns in Tasmania